Kwagga is a nickname, taken from the Afrikaans name for the quagga, an extinct subspecies of the plains zebra. People with this nickname include:
Kwagga Boucher (born 1983), retired South African rugby union player
Kwagga Smith (born 1993), South African rugby union player

See also 
Kwaggafontein

Hypocorisms
Lists of people by nickname